Amanda Coetzer was the defending champion, but lost in second round to Marta Marrero.

Qualifier Iveta Benešová won the title by defeating Flavia Pennetta 7–6(7–5), 6–4 in the final. It was her first singles title of her career.

Seeds
The first two seeds received a bye into the second round.

Draw

Finals

Top half

Bottom half

References
 Main and Qualifying Draws

2004 Abierto Mexicano Telcel
2004 WTA Tour